The 9th Jutra Awards were held on February 18, 2007 to honour films made with the participation of the Quebec film industry in 2006.

Winners and nominees

References

2007 in Quebec
Jutra
09
Jutra